Wehdem is an unincorporated community in Austin County, in the U.S. state of Texas. It is located within the Greater Houston metropolitan area.

History
The area in what is now known as Wehdem today was first settled by White settlers in the 1830s. It was originally named New Wehdem, and was founded west of the Bellville-Brenham station on the Gulf, Colorado and Santa Fe Railway by settlers who came to the area from Germany around 1890. A post office was established at Wehdem in 1904 and remained in operation until 1906. It received its mail from Brenham soon after. It had a church and two stores in the early 1930s. Its population was 10 in 1936 and grew to 20 in 1949 with only one business and remained at that level through 1962.

Geography

Education
Wehdem had its own school in the 1930s. Today, the community is served by the Bellville Independent School District.

References

Unincorporated communities in Austin County, Texas
Unincorporated communities in Texas